Joseph Anthoon (born 11 August 1930) is a Belgian former swimmer. He competed in the men's 4 × 200 metre freestyle relay at the 1952 Summer Olympics.

References

External links
 

1930 births
Possibly living people
Olympic swimmers of Belgium
Swimmers at the 1952 Summer Olympics
Swimmers from Antwerp
People from Borgerhout
Belgian male freestyle swimmers